The Lovers is a trump or "Major Arcana" tarot card.

The Lovers  may also refer to:

Art
The Lovers (Abbasi), a 1630 painting by Reza Abbasi
The Lovers (Daen), a 1964 public sculpture by Lindsay Daen
The Lovers (di Suvero), a 1971 public sculpture by Mark di Suvero
The Lovers (Friant), an 1888 painting by Émile Friant
The Lovers (Giulio Romano), a 1525 painting by Giulio Romano
The Lovers, two paintings by René Magritte

Film and television

Film
 The Lovers (1946 film), an Italian film
 The Lovers (1951 film), a Mexican film
 The Lovers (1958 film) (Les Amants), a French film directed by Louis Malle
 The Lovers! (1973 film), based on the British TV series
 The Lovers (1994 film), a Hong Kong film directed by Tsui Hark
 The Lovers (2013 film), previously known as Singularity, by Roland Joffé
 The Lovers (2017 film), a comedy drama starring Debra Winger and Tracy Letts

Television
The Lovers (Saturday Night Live), a recurring series of Saturday Night Live sketches
The Lovers (TV series), a 1970–1971 British sitcom

Literature
The Lovers (Farmer novella and novel), a 1952 novella, expanded into a 1961 novel, by Philip José Farmer
The Lovers, a 2010 novel by Vendela Vida
The Lovers, a 1993 novel by Morris West

Music
The Lovers (band), a UK-based French electronica/pop band
The Lovers, a 1950s R&B duo of Tarheel Slim and Little Ann
The Lovers (album) or the title song, by the Legendary Pink Dots, 1984
"The Lovers" (Alexander O'Neal song), 1988
"The Lovers", a song by Nine Inch Nails from Add Violence, 2017
The Lovers (musical), a 2022 Australian musical theatre adaptation of A Midsummer Night's Dream

Philosophy
Rival Lovers or The Lovers, a Socratic dialogue

See also
Lover (disambiguation), including uses of Lovers
The Lover (disambiguation)